Felimare villafranca is a species of colourful sea slug or dorid nudibranch, a marine gastropod mollusc in the family Chromodorididae.

Distribution
This nudibranch is found on the coasts of the Eastern Atlantic Ocean and the Mediterranean Sea from France, the Bay of Biscay to Morocco, Cape Verde Islands, Canary Islands and the Azores.

Description
This species is predominantly dark blue in colour with a pattern of longitudinal yellow lines. The yellow lines branch and curve, sometimes forming a network in the middle of the back. At the edge of the mantle there is a double yellow line with a series of bright blue elongate patches or a broken blue line between it and the next set of lines which cover the back. A series of white patches may be positioned inside these blue markings. The rhinophores are translucent blue with opaque white pigment at the base of the club and in a line on the back; the tips are blue. The gills are also translucent blue with a midline of opaque white on the inner and outer faces. The body grows to a length of 40 mm.

References

External links
 

Chromodorididae
Gastropods described in 1818
Taxa named by Antoine Risso
Molluscs of the Atlantic Ocean
Molluscs of the Mediterranean Sea
Molluscs of the Azores
Molluscs of the Canary Islands
Gastropods of Cape Verde